Triphosphoric acid (also tripolyphosphoric acid), with formula H5P3O10, is a condensed form of phosphoric acid. In the family of phosphoric acids, it is the next polyphosphoric acid after pyrophosphoric acid, H4P2O7, also called diphosphoric acid.

Compounds such as ATP (adenosine triphosphate) are esters of triphosphoric acid.

Triphosphoric acid has not been obtained in crystalline form. The equilibrium mixture with an overall composition corresponding to H5P3O10 contains about 20% of triphosphoric acid. A solution of the pure species can be obtained by ion exchange of the sodium salt, sodium triphosphate, at 0 °C.

Triphosporic acid is a pentaprotic acid, meaning that it can release five protons in basic enough conditions. Sources differ on the corresponding pKa values: 

 1.0; 2.2; 2.3; 5.7; 8.5
 1.0; 2.2; 2.3; 3.7; 8.5
 small; small; 2.30; 6.50; 9.24

References

Phosphorus oxoacids
Phosphorus(V) compounds